JWH-161 is a cannabinoid derivative that was designed by Dr John W. Huffman's team as a hybrid between the dibenzopyran "classical" cannabinoid drugs and the novel indole derivatives, in an attempt to unravel the differences in their binding modes to the CB1 receptor. While retaining structural elements from both families, JWH-161 has a CB1 Ki of 19.0nM, although it was found to be slightly weaker than THC in animal tests.

References

Carbazoles
Benzochromenes
JWH cannabinoids
Phenol ethers
Heterocyclic compounds with 5 rings
Nitrogen heterocycles
Oxygen heterocycles